Thirteen is a 1974 Hong Kong coming-of-age film directed by Sung Tsun-shou and produced by Shaw Brothers Studio. It was based on the novel Zaoshu ("matured early") by Taiwanese novelist Kuo Liang-hui.

Cast and characters
 Chin Han as Lu Tao-jan, a newspaper publisher.
 Hsia Ping as Lan Chin, Lu's wife. The marriage is unhappy, and she spends most of her time playing mahjong. She treats her daughters rudely, but spoils her son.
 Ku Chiu-chin as Lu Yun-pai, Lu Tao-jan's oldest daughter. She is married, pregnant and hardworking.
 Chen I-ling as Lu Chin-pai, Lu Tao-jan's second daughter. She spends most of her time dressing up and hanging out with her boyfriend.
 Tien Niu as Lu Chih-pai, Lu Tao-jan's third daughter and the protagonist of the film. She is 13 and does not like to study. She also does not get along with Chin-pai, with whom she shares a room.
 Yuan Man-tzu as Lu Hsiu-pai, Lu Tao-jan's fourth daughter.
 Chiang Ko-ai as Lu Li-pai, Lu Tao-jan's fifth daughter.
 Hsu Chia-lin as Lu Sheng-pai, Lu Tao-jan's son and the youngest child. 
 Ling Yun as Shih Hsin-chiao, a 30-year-old journalist who trained under Lu Tao-jan.
 Huang Shu-yi as Shih Hsin-ju, Shih Hsin-chiao's cousin in Macau. Her husband is in America, living with another woman.
 Wong Yue as Hung Sen, a playboy 2 grades higher than Chih-pai.
 Wang Ching-ho as the gynecologist.

Plot
Shih Hsin-chiao, a journalist who trained under mentor Lu Tao-jan, is a family friend of the Lus and well-liked by the children. Lu's 13-year-old daughter Chih-pai is infatuated with "Uncle Shih", but Shih sees her only as a child. Lu Tao-jan is transferred to Macau, where he has an affair with Shih's cousin. When Shih returns after a trip to Japan, he finds Chih-pai an attractive young woman. After repeatedly being rejected by Shih, Chih-pai has a relationship with a rich playboy Hung Sen, which leaves her pregnant. Desperate, she goes to the only man who can help her: Shih.

References

External links
 Trailer with English subtitles
 
 

1974 films
Hong Kong drama films
Shaw Brothers Studio films
Films based on Taiwanese novels
Films directed by Sung Tsun-shou
1970s Hong Kong films